Eedo Rakam Aado Rakam is a 2016 Telugu-language romantic comedy film, produced by Sunkara Ramabrahmam on A.K. Entertainments banner and directed by G. Nageswara Reddy. It features Vishnu Manchu, Raj Tarun, Sonarika Bhadoria and Hebah Patel  while Rajendra Prasad appears in a crucial supporting role and music composed by Sai Karthik. The film is based on Punjabi film Carry On Jatta (2012) which was inspired by the Malayalam movie Chakkikotha Chankaran (1989).

The film's music was released on 26 March 2016 in Hyderabad. The film released worldwide on 14 April 2016.

Plot
The film revolves around two friends Arjun and Ashwin. Arjun is the son of a very rich leading lawyer, advocate Narayana while Ashwin is the son of a police Inspector M. Koteswara Rao.  They both visit their friend Kishore's wedding where they fall for two charming girls Neelaveni and Supriya respectively. Neelaveni is the sister of Gaja while Supriya is the sister of Dattu, who are popular goons and rivals in the city. Neelaveni makes a firm decision to marry only an orphan. So, Arjun pretends as an orphan and gains her love. Gaja accepts their love and directly couples up with them. Thereafter, Arjun and Neelaveni are in search of a rented house and unfortunately, Neelaveni rents the upper portion of Arjun's house. Thereupon, the troubles start, so, Arjun forges Ashwin as Neelaveni's husband before his family members and Ashwin as Narayana's son to Neelaveni. Meanwhile, Dattu also intends to meet Ashwin but he wants a rich alliance with his sister. So, Ashwin also bluffs as the son of Narayana to which Arjun also supports and successfully carries out his espousal.

Fearing that their secret will be exposed if he and Supriya get married in front of the family, Ashwin marries Supriya in court. This creates confusion. As Narayana told Arjun that he knows about Arjun getting married without letting him know about it. Arjun assumes it as his and Neelaveni's, whereas Naryana referred to Ashwin and Supriya's.

Supriya learns about the whole drama and supports them. Things start to get complicated when one of Gaga's henchmen Raghu sees Arjun with Supriya and tries to tell the truth to Neelaveni. However, Ashwin manages to fool him. And sends him to the police station. This becomes a problem for Ashwin, as Raghu went to the police station where Ashwin's father works and there he sees Dattu's henchmen already captured. Dattu's henchmen tell Inspector Koteswara that Aswin is not his son but Advocate Narayan's.

To avoid getting caught, Ashwin accepted it. This made his father sad and depressed. On the other hand, Neelaveni gets pregnant with Arjun's child so Arjun decides to tell her the truth. On the other hand, Raghu told Gaja about Arjun and Supriya's marriage and Dattu's henchmen told Dattu about Ashwin being a police inspector's son and both set out to finish Arjun and Ashwin respectively.

A cat and mouse fight assures between Gaja's henchmen and Dattu's henchmen. Meanwhile, Supriya explains everything to Koteswara and Narayana. Later on, Gaja and Dattu become friends and accept their sister's husbands with their respective families.

Cast

Vishnu Manchu as Arjun
Raj Tarun as Ashwin
Sonarika Bhadoria as Neelaveni
Hebah Patel as Supriya
Rajendra Prasad as Advocate Narayana
Posani Krishna Murali as Inspector M. Koteswara Rao
Sunil in a cameo appearance
Ravi Babu as Aadi Narayana
Abhimanyu Singh as Gaja, Neelaveni's brother
Vennela Kishore as Kishore
Thagubothu Ramesh as Rikshawala
Supreeth as Dattu, Supriya's brother
Prabhas Sreenu as Seenu
Fish Venkat as Henchmen 
Shakalaka Shankar as Tenant
Kadambari Kiran as Constable
Tarzan as Constable
Satya Krishnan as Satya
Hema as Supriya's sister-in-law
Geetha Singh as Zarina
 Sri Sudha Bhimireddy

Soundtrack

The music was composed by Sai Karthik and Think Music India holds the audio rights for the film. Music was released on 26 March 2016 at Taj Deccan in Hyderabad. Vishnu Manchu's father, Mohan Babu, was the chief guest for the event.

Release and reception
The film was released theatrically on 14 April 2016. It was also dubbed and released in Hindi on YouTube as Hyper on 23 February 2018 by Goldmines Telefilms.

A critic from Deccan Chronicle wrote that "Technically the film is average and the climax could have been better, it seemed that they were in a hurry to finish it".

References

External links
 

2016 films
2010s Telugu-language films
2016 romantic comedy films
Indian romantic comedy films
Telugu remakes of Punjabi films
Films directed by G. Nageswara Reddy
Films scored by Sai Karthik